Kenan Sipahi (born May 26, 1995) is a Turkish professional basketball player for Pınar Karşıyaka of the Basketbol Süper Ligi (BSL).

Early years
Kenan Sipahi was born in 1995 in Pristina, Kosovo to Celal Sipahi and Bisera Sipahi, he has Turkish background. Sipahi started playing basketball in Pristina at the age of 9 and quickly became a top-level prospect in Turkey at 15.

Professional career
He made his professional debut in the Turkish League with Tofaş Bursa during the 2010–11 season. He was already playing regularly at the age of 16.

Sipahi made his breakthrough in a 2012–13 season. He played plenty of minutes in the league and EuroChallenge. On January 15, 2013, he scored a game winning three-pointer against Khimik. He averaged 7 points and 2.7 assists in 32 league games.

On September 2, 2013, he signed a three-year contract with option to extend for one season with Fenerbahçe. At the age of 19, he made the roster of Fenerbahçe in the Euroleague. In February 2014, he had season-ending injury, after breaking his arm in Turkish Cup game against Trabzonspor. In his first Euroleague season with the team, he averaged 2.7 points, 1.1 assists and 1 rebound over 15 games.

On September 30, 2015, he was loaned to Karşıyaka for one season. Over the season, he averaged 7.6 points, 4.2 rebounds and 3.5 assists per game in the Turkish League, while also having career-high averages of 5.3 points and 3.7 assists in the Euroleague. On July 1, 2016, he was released from Fenerbahçe.

On July 13, 2016, Sipahi signed a one-year contract with Beşiktaş. On July 18, 2017, he re-signed with Beşiktaş for two more seasons. On August 6, 2019, Sipahi signed a two-year deal with Spanish club Coosur Real Betis.

On July 16, 2020, he has signed with Fenerbahçe of the Turkish Basketball Super League. On June 17, 2021, Sipahi parted ways with the Turkish club once more.

On September 15, 2021, he has signed with Casademont Zaragoza of the Liga ACB. Sipahi parted ways with the team on December 10.

On December 16, 2021, he has signed with Beşiktaş Icrypex of the Basketbol Süper Ligi (BSL).

On June 21, 2022, he has signed with Pınar Karşıyaka of the Basketbol Süper Ligi (BSL) for as second stint after six years.

Turkish national team
Sipahi is a regular Turkish youth national team player. He helped Turkey's U-18 national team win the gold medal at the 2013 FIBA Europe Under-18 Championship, where he was named to the MVP and All-Tournament Team, averaging 10.9 points, 3.8 rebounds, and 5.0 assists. Also he played at the EuroBasket 2017 with Turkey's men's basketball national team

Personal life
Sipahi is fluent in Turkish, Albanian, Serbian and English languages.

He married Albanian model Ilda Abazi in July 2021 in a lavish ceremony at the Ciragan Kempinski palace in Istanbul.

Career statistics

Euroleague

|-
| style="text-align:left;"| 2013–14
| style="text-align:left;" rowspan=2| Fenerbahçe
| 15 || 8 || 12.6 || .517 || .364 || .700 || 1.0 || 1.1 || .5 || .1 || 2.7 || 2.1
|-
| style="text-align:left;"| 2014–15
| 22 || 11 || 9.8 || .318 || .192 || .750 || .8 || .7 || .4 || .0 || 1.6 || .2
|-
| style="text-align:left;"| 2015–16
| style="text-align:left;"| Karşıyaka
| 10 || 5 || 18.9 || .358 || .200 || .688 || 1.1 || 3.7 || .9 || .0 || 5.3 || 6.1
|- class="sortbottom"
| style="text-align:left;"| Career
| style="text-align:left;"|
| 47 || 24 || 12.6 || .381 || .228 || .700 || .9 || 1.4 || .5 || .0 || 2.8 || 2.0

Accomplishments and awards

Individual
2013 FIBA Europe Under-18 Championship: MVP
2013 FIBA Europe Under-18 Championship: All-Tournament Team

References

External links
Kenan Sipahi at euroleague.net
Kenan Sipahi at fiba.com
Kenan Sipahi at tblstat.net

1995 births
Living people
Basket Zaragoza players
Beşiktaş men's basketball players
Fenerbahçe men's basketball players
Karşıyaka basketball players
Kosovan expatriate basketball people in Spain
Liga ACB players
Point guards
Real Betis Baloncesto players
Sportspeople from Pristina
Tofaş S.K. players
Turkish expatriate basketball people in Spain
Turkish men's basketball players
Turkish people of Albanian descent
Turkish people of Kosovan descent